Mob Wives is an American reality television series that premiered on VH1 on April 17, 2011, concluding on March 16, 2016. The show follows the lives of several women residing in Staten Island, whose family members and husbands have been arrested and imprisoned for crimes that are connected to the American Mafia.

Series overview

Episodes

Season 1 (2011)

Season 2 (2012)

Season 3 (2013)

Season 4: New Blood (2013–14)

Season 5: Trust No One  (2014–15)

Season 6: The Last Stand (2016)

References

Lists of American non-fiction television series episodes
Lists of reality television series episodes